Adam Richards is a drifting driver from New Plymouth, New Zealand. He has been drifting competitively since 2003 and was crowned the 2005 D1NZ champion driving a modified Nissan Cefiro.
He has competed in the D1 World All Stars Drift Championship in 2006 and 2007.

Cars

Nissan Cefiro A31 
Adam started in the D1NZ series using a modified Nissan Cefiro with camouflage coloured paint by Steven Sole Customs.  Not Stickers. He swapped the standard engine with a RB26DET from a Nissan Skyline GT-R to increase the power output. This helped him to get a spot on the podium in four out of the six rounds of 2005. Adam stopped using this car competitively after the first round of D1NZ 2006, making way for a sponsored Nissan Silvia.

The Cefiro made a return in round 3 of Drift Revolution 2007, sporting a new exterior design.
After a few competitions in New Zealand the car was shipped to America to compete in the D1 All stars. He is currently competing in the European Drift Championship with the car.

Nissan Silvia S15 (HKS) 
After winning the 2005 championship, Adam approached with new sponsors HKS and Dodson's, built a new car for the upcoming 2006 season. Starting from a ground up rebuild, primarily with HKS parts, the total build cost was roughly $150,000 (NZ). He competed with this car throughout 2006 and 2007, although struggled, finishing eighth in the 2006 season.

References 

New Zealand racing drivers
Living people
Drifting drivers
Sportspeople from New Plymouth
Year of birth missing (living people)